The Fujifilm X-T3 is a mirrorless interchangeable-lens digital camera announced on September 6, 2018. It is weather-resistant, has a backside-illuminated X-Trans CMOS 4 APS-C sensor and an X-Processor 4 quad core processor. It is the successor to 2016's Fujifilm X-T2. It uses the Fujifilm X-mount.

The X-T3 is capable of recording video in 4K resolution up to 60 fps. The X-T3 is intended to be sold new either as the camera body only, or with the 18-55 mm lens. The camera is available in 2 colors, black and silver and is styled after an SLR camera.

The X-T4, which was announced on February 26, 2020, is the successor to the X-T3. However, the X-T3 continued to be offered even after the X-T4 was introduced. On September 2, 2021, Fujifilm announced X-T3 WW (worldwide) which simplifies supply chains and can be sold at a lower price since a battery charger is not included.

Key features 
The X-T3 is a mirrorless compact camera made by Fujifilm. It measures 132.5 mm x 92.8 mm x 58.8 mm and weighs 539 g including memory card and battery.

Mechanical dials are provided for key operations, including shutter speed, ISO sensitivity, exposure compensation, drive modes and metering modes. It lacks built-in flash, but includes a flash unit.

26.1 megapixels X-Trans CMOS IV sensor.
Weather resistant structure
X-Processor 4, a quad-core CPU.
23.5 mm x 15.6 mm CMOS sensor (APS-C) Fujifilm X-Trans sensor.
Touch screen with 3-way tilt
Selectable film simulations
425-point hybrid AF system
30 fps shooting in 1.25x crop 'Sports Finder' mode
60 fps shooting in 1.18x crop in 4K
Hybrid autofocus
New Phase detection AF to entire frame
Up to 30 fps black-out free high-speed continuous shooting
4K video up to 60fps 10 bit recording
4K Burst, 4K Multi Focus
Headphone and Microphone sockets
USB-C which can be used for charging battery
WiFi connectivity for connection and tagging via a smartphone
Bluetooth connectivity for connection and tagging via a smartphone
Dual UHS-II SD card slot
Available in silver and black

Included accessories 

 Li-ion battery NP-W126S
 Battery charger BC-W126S
 Shoe-mount flash unit EF-X8

References

External links

X-T3
Cameras introduced in 2018